The 2019 Liechtenstein local elections were held on 24 March and 14 April to elect the municipal councils and the mayors of the eleven municipalities of Liechtenstein.

Electoral system
The municipal councils (German: Gemeinderat) are composed of an even number of councillors plus the mayor (German: Gemeindevorsteher). The number of councillors is determined by population count: 6 or 8 councillors for population 1,500, 8 or 10 councillors for population between 1,500 and 3,000, and 10 or 12 councillors for population over 3,000.

Councillors were elected in single multi-member districts, consisting of the municipality's territory, using an open list proportional representation system. Voting was on the basis of universal suffrage in a secret ballot.
The mayors were elected in a two-round system. As three of the municipalities saw none of the candidates achieving a majority in the first round, a second round was held four weeks later, where the candidate with a plurality were elected as a mayor.

Mayoral elections results

Summary

By municipality

First round

Second round

Municipal council elections results

Summary

Results by municipality

References

2019
Liechtenstein
Local election